Tadhg Ua Dálaigh, Irish poet and Chief Ollam of Ireland, died 1181.

Biography

A son of Cú Connacht Ua Dálaigh (died 1139) the Annals of Lough Ce say that he was the  chief poet of Erinn and Alba (of Ireland and Scotland). He was one of the earliest members of the Ó Dálaigh clan of poets, and the second to be accorded the title of Ireland's chief poet. His son, Aonghus Ó Dálaigh is held to be the common ancestor of all the O'Daly's extant.

External links

People from County Westmeath
Medieval Irish poets
12th-century Irish poets
12th-century Irish writers
1181 deaths
Year of birth unknown
Irish male poets